Jean-Antoine Injalbert (1845–1933) was a much-decorated French sculptor, born in Béziers.

Life 
The son of a stonemason, Injalbert was a pupil of Augustin-Alexandre Dumont and won the prestigious Prix de Rome in 1874. At the Exposition Universelle of 1889 he won the Grand Prix, and in 1900 was a member of the jury. On the day of the inauguration of the Pont Mirabeau in Paris, Injalbert was made an officer of the Légion d'honneur. In 1905 he was made a member of the Institut de France, and in 1910 promoted to Commander of the Légion d'honneur.

His work shows powerful imagination and strong personality, as well as great knowledge.  From about 1915 onwards he became influential as a teacher, at the Académie Colarossi and as chief instructor at the École des Beaux Arts. Among his many students were Prague sculptor František Bílek, Alfred Janniot, Fernand Guignier, Gleb W. Derujinsky and the American sculptor Edward McCartan, and Aaron Goodelman.

Many of his works are in the "Hôtel Fayet" -  one of the three "Musée Des Beaux-Arts" in  Béziers - and the "Villa Antonine", his old family home and summer studio.

Work 

 four allegorical figures on the Pont Mirabeau, Paris: The City of Paris, Navigation, Commerce and Abundance, 1896
 monument to Molière at Pézenas, 1897
 Crucifixion, at the Cathedral of Rheims, 1898
 Bordeaux and Toulouse, allegorical statues for the Gare de Tours, 1898, for architect Victor Laloux
 tympanum depicting the city of Paris surrounded by muses, Petit Palais Paris, circa 1900
 allegorical figures of the Loire and the Cher rivers, for the Hôtel de Ville, Tours, for Laloux, c. 1900
 figures of Electricity and Commerce on the Pont de Bir-Hakeim, Paris, 1905
 Monument to the Dead, Béziers, 1925
 Hippomenes at the Jardin du Luxembourg, Paris
 Eve After the Fall, in Montpellier
 monument to Sadi-Carnot in Sète
 Love Conquering the Lion, Fame, The Laughing Child and several others, in Béziers
 figure of Honoré Mirabeau at the Panthéon (Paris)
 bust of Louis Gallet, in Valence, Drôme

Images

See also
List of works by Jean Antoine Injalbert

References

Sources

External links

 Hôtel Fayet
 Villa Antonine
 

1845 births
1933 deaths
People from Béziers
Members of the Académie des beaux-arts
Academic staff of the École des Beaux-Arts
French architectural sculptors
Prix de Rome for sculpture
Commandeurs of the Légion d'honneur
20th-century French sculptors
19th-century French sculptors
French male sculptors
Members of the Ligue de la patrie française
19th-century French male artists